Delhi Gate may refer to:
 Delhi Gate, Delhi, the southern gate to the Walled City of Delhi, also known as Shahjahanabad or Old Delhi
 Delhi Gate, Lahore, one of the thirteen gates of the Walled City of Lahore
 Delhi Gate, Aurangabad, a gate in Aurangabad
 Delhi Gate (Vellore)
 Delhi Gate (film), a 2018 Pakistani film

See also
 Lahori Gate (disambiguation)
 Kashmiri Gate (disambiguation)